Quercus dentata, also called Japanese emperor oak or daimyo oak (kashiwa; ; , tteokgalnamu) is a species of oak native to East Asia (Japan, Korea and China). The name of the tree is often translated as "sweet oak" in English to distinguish it from Western varieties. It is placed in section Quercus.

Description 
The leaves are often retained dead on the tree into winter. Both sides of the leaf are initially downy with the upper surface becoming smooth.

The flowers are produced in May; the male flowers are pendulous catkins. The female flowers are sessile, growing near the tips of new shoots, producing acorns 1.2–2.3 cm long and 1.2–1.5 cm broad, in broad, bushy-scaled cups; the acorns mature in September to October.

Cultivation outside East Asia
Quercus dentata was introduced to the British Isles in 1830, where it is occasionally grown in botanical gardens. It is usually smaller in cultivation than in the wild, growing to a small angular tree or large irregular shrub.

Culinary uses
In Korean cuisine, its acorns (in Hangul: 도토리, dotori) have been used since the Three Kingdoms. A notable food is dotorimuk.

In Japanese cuisine, its leaves are used as a wrapping for kashiwa mochi.

References

External links
 
line drawing, Flora of China Illustrations vol. 4, fig. 360, 1 

dentata
Flora of China
Flora of Japan
Flora of Korea
Trees of Asia
Least concern plants
Least concern biota of Asia
Plants described in 1784